Redemption value is the price at which the issuing company may choose to repurchase a  security before its maturity date.
A bond is purchased "at a discount" if its redemption value exceeds its purchase price.  It is purchased "at a premium" if its purchase price exceeds its redemption value. Thus, the right will only be exercised at a discount.

See: Callable bond; Embedded option; Convertible bond.

References

Bonds (finance)
Embedded options
Fixed income analysis
Bond valuation